G. carnea may refer to:

 Garrha carnea, a concealer moth
 Geopyxis carnea, an apothecal fungus
 Gersemia carnea, a soft coral
 Glomera carnea, a flowering plant
 Glycera carnea, a blood worm
 Goodyera carnea, a white-flowered orchid